Syracuse is a city in and the county seat of Onondaga County, New York, United States. It is the fifth-most populous city in the state of New York following New York City, Buffalo, Yonkers, and Rochester.

At the 2020 census, the city's population was 148,620 and its metropolitan area had a population of 662,057. It is the economic and educational hub of Central New York, a region with over one million inhabitants. Syracuse is also well-provided with convention sites, with a downtown convention complex. Syracuse was named after the classical Greek city Syracuse (Siracusa in Italian), a city on the eastern coast of the Italian island of Sicily.

Historically, the city has functioned as a major crossroads over the last two centuries, first between the Erie Canal and its branch canals, then of the railway network. Today, Syracuse is at the intersection of Interstates 81 and 90. Its airport is the largest in the Central New York region.

Syracuse is home to Syracuse University, SUNY Upstate Medical University, SUNY ESF, and Le Moyne College.

History 

French missionaries were the first Europeans to come to this area, arriving to work with and convert the Native Americans in the mid-17th century. At the invitation of the Onondaga Nation, one of the five nations of the Iroquois Confederacy, a Jesuit priest by the name of Simon Le Moyne, accompanied by soldiers and coureurs des bois, including Pierre Esprit Radisson, set up a mission, known as Ste. Marie de Gannentaha on the northeast shore of Onondaga Lake.

Jesuit missionaries reported salty brine springs around the southern end of what they referred to as "Salt Lake", known today as Onondaga Lake in honor of the historic tribe. French fur traders established trade throughout the New York area among the Iroquois. Dutch and English colonists also were traders, and the English nominally claimed the area, from their upstate base at Albany, New York. During the American Revolutionary War, the highly decentralized Iroquois divided into groups and bands that supported the British, and two tribes that supported the American-born rebels, or patriots.

Settlers came into central and western New York from eastern parts of the state and New England after the American Revolutionary War and various treaties with and land sales by Native American tribes. The subsequent designation of this area by the state of New York as the Onondaga Salt Springs Reservation provided the basis for commercial salt production. Such production took place from the late 1700s through the early 1900s. Brine from wells that tapped into halite (common salt) beds in the Salina shale near Tully, New York, 15 miles south of the city, was developed in the 19th century. It is the north-flowing brine from Tully that is the source of salt for the "salty springs" found along the shoreline of Onondaga Lake. The rapid development of this industry in the 18th and 19th centuries led to the nicknaming of this area as "The Salt City".

The original settlement of Syracuse was a conglomeration of several small towns and villages and was not recognized with a post office by the United States Government. Establishing the post office was delayed because the settlement did not have a name. Joshua Forman wanted to name the village Corinth. When John Wilkinson applied for a post office in that name in 1820, it was denied because the same name was already in use in Saratoga County, New York. Having read a poetic description of Syracuse, Sicily (Siracusa), Wilkinson saw similarities to the lake and salt springs of this area, which had both "salt and freshwater mingling together". On February 4, 1820, Wilkinson proposed the name "Syracuse" to a group of fellow townsmen; it became the name of the village and the new post office.

The first Solvay Process Company plant in the United States was erected on the southwestern shore of Onondaga Lake in 1884. The village was called Solvay to commemorate the inventor Ernest Solvay. In 1861, he developed the ammonia-soda process for the manufacture of soda ash (anhydrous sodium carbonate) from brine wells dug in the southern end of Tully valley (as a source of sodium chloride) and limestone (as a source of calcium carbonate). The process was an improvement over the earlier Leblanc process. The Syracuse Solvay plant was the incubator for a large chemical industry complex owned by Allied Signal in Syracuse. While this industry stimulated development and provided many jobs in Syracuse, it left Onondaga Lake as the most polluted in the nation.

The salt industry declined after the Civil War, but a new manufacturing industry arose in its place. Throughout the late 1800s and early 1900s, numerous businesses and stores were established, including the Franklin Automobile Company, which produced the first air-cooled engine in the world; the Century Motor Vehicle Company; the Smith Corona company; and the Craftsman Workshops, the center of Gustav Stickley's handmade furniture empire.

On March 24, 1870, Syracuse University was founded. The State of New York granted the new university its own charter, independent of Genesee College, which had unsuccessfully tried to move to Syracuse the year before. The university was founded as coeducational. President Peck stated at the opening ceremonies, "The conditions of admission shall be equal to all persons... there shall be no invidious discrimination here against woman.... brains and heart shall have a fair chance... " Syracuse implemented this policy and attracted a high proportion of women students. In the College of Liberal Arts, the ratio between male and female students during the 19th century was approximately even. The College of Fine Arts was predominantly female, and a low ratio of women enrolled in the College of Medicine and the College of Law.

The first New York State Fair was held in Syracuse in 1841. Between 1842 and 1889, the Fair was held among 11 New York cities before finding a permanent home in Syracuse. It has been an annual event since then, except between 1942 and 1947, when the grounds were used as a military base during World War II, and in 2020, due to the outbreak of the COVID-19 pandemic.

As part of the racial incidents happening all over the country during the 1919 Red Summer, on July 31, 1919, there was a violent riot between white and black workers of the Syracuse Globe Malleable Iron Works.

Syracuse is home to the only "green on top" traffic light. The "green on top" traffic light was installed in 1928 as a result of local youths throwing rocks at the "British red" light that was originally on top. These locals became known as "stonethrowers" and the neighborhood now has the Tipperary Hill Heritage Memorial on the corner of Tompkins Street and Milton Avenue to commemorate this history.

World War II stimulated significant industrial expansion in the area: of specialty steel, fasteners, and custom machining. After the war, two of the Big Three automobile manufacturers (General Motors and Chrysler) had major operations in the area. Syracuse was also headquarters for Carrier Corporation, and Crouse-Hinds manufactured traffic signals in the city. General Electric, with its headquarters in Schenectady to the east, had its main television manufacturing plant at Electronics Parkway in Syracuse.

The manufacturing industry in Syracuse began to falter in the 1970s, as the industry restructured nationwide. Many small businesses failed during this time, which contributed to the already increasing unemployment rate. Rockwell International moved its factory outside New York state. General Electric moved its television manufacturing operations to Suffolk, Virginia, and later offshore to Asia. The Carrier Corporation moved its headquarters out of Syracuse, relocated its manufacturing operations out of state, and outsourced some of its production to Asian facilities. Although the city population has declined since 1950, the Syracuse metropolitan area population has remained fairly stable, growing by 2.5 percent since 1970. While this growth rate is greater than much of Upstate New York, it is far below the national average during that period.

Geography and climate

Geography 
Syracuse is located at  (43.046899, −76.144423).

The city developed at the northeast corner of the Finger Lakes region. The city has many neighborhoods that were originally independent villages, which joined the city over the years. Although the central part of Syracuse is flat, many of its neighborhoods are on small hills such as University Hill and Tipperary Hill. Land to the north of Syracuse is generally flat, while land to the south is hilly.

About 27 percent of Syracuse's land area is covered by 890,000 trees — a higher percentage than in Albany, Rochester or Buffalo. The Labor Day Storm of 1998 was a derecho that destroyed approximately 30,000 trees. The sugar maple accounts for 14.2 percent of Syracuse's trees, followed by the Northern white cedar (9.8 percent) and the European buckthorn (6.8 percent). The most common street tree is the Norway maple (24.3 percent), followed by the honey locust (9.3 percent).

The densest tree cover in Syracuse is in the two Valley neighborhoods, where 46.6 percent of the land is covered by trees. The lowest tree cover percentage is found in the densely developed downtown, which has only 4.6 percent trees.

Water from nearby Onondaga Lake is not potable due to industrial dumping that spanned many decades, leaving the lake heavily polluted. Incoming water is left unfiltered, and chlorine is added to prevent bacterial growth. Most of the environmental work to achieve lake cleanup was scheduled to be completed by 2016; however Honeywell, the company tasked with the cleanup, announced the project's completion in late 2017. For periods of drought, there is also a backup line which uses water from Lake Ontario.

Onondaga Creek, a waterway that runs through downtown, flows northward through the city. The Onondaga Creekwalk borders this, connecting the Lakefront, Inner Harbor, Franklin Square and Armory Square neighborhoods. The creek continues through the Valley and ultimately to the Onondaga Nation. The creek is navigable, but it can be a challenge. Its channelized nature speeds up its flow, particularly in the spring, when it may be dangerous. After some youngsters drowned in the creek, some residential areas fenced-off the creek in their neighborhoods.

Climate 

Syracuse has a hot-summer humid continental climate (Dfa), as mean July temperatures are just above the  threshold needed for a hot-summer climate. The city is known for its high snowfall,  on average; Syracuse receives the most annual average snow of any metropolitan area in the United States. Syracuse usually wins the Golden Snowball Award among Upstate cities. Its record seasonal (July 1 to June 30 of the following year) snowfall so far is  during the winter of 1992–93, while the snowiest calendar month was January 2004, with  accumulated. The high snowfall is a result of the city receiving both heavy snow from the lake effect of nearby Lake Ontario (of the Great Lakes) and nor'easter snow from storms driven from the Atlantic Ocean. Snow most often falls in small (about ), almost daily doses, over a period of several days. Larger snowfalls do occur occasionally, and even more so in the northern suburbs.

The Blizzard of 1993 was described as the Storm of the Century. Some   fell on the city within 48 hours, with  falling within the first 24 hours. Syracuse received more snow than any other city in the country during this storm, which shattered a total of eight local records, including the most snow in a single snowstorm. The Blizzard of '58 occurred in February (16–17th) across Oswego and Onondaga counties. This storm was classified as a blizzard due to the high winds, blowing snow, and cold;  of snow was measured at Syracuse and drifts reached  in Oswego County. (See Thirtieth Publication of the Oswego County Historical Society, (1969) and The Climate and Snow Climatology of Oswego N.Y., (1971) 

In the early 21st century, a handful of previous heat records have been broken in the city. The latter was the warmest winter day on record.

Notes

Demographics 

As of the census of 2010, there were 145,170 people, 57,355 households, and 28,455 families residing in the city. The racial makeup of the city was 56.0% White, 29.5% African American, 1.1% Native American, 5.5% Asian, 0.03% Pacific Islander, 2.7% from other races, and 5.1% from two or more races. Hispanic or Latino residents of any race were 8.3% of the population.

The largest ancestries include Italian (29.5%), Irish (18.4%), Polish (15.3%), German (9.6%), English (4.5%), and Slovak (3.6%). Non-Hispanic Whites were 52.8% of the population in 2010, down from 87.2% in 1970. Suburbanization attracted residents outside the city, even as new immigrant and migrant groups increased.

There were 57,355 households, out of which 29% had children under the age of 18 living with them, 9.3% were married couples living together, 20.8% had a female householder with no husband present, and 50.4% were non-families. 38.4% of all households were made up of individuals, and 10.4% had someone living alone who was 65 years of age or older. The average household size was 2.31 and the average family size was 3.14.

The city's age distribution was as follows: 19% of residents were under the age of 15, 23% from 15 to 24, 25.6% from 25 to 44, 21.7% from 45 to 64, and 10.5% who were 65 years of age or older. The median age was 29.6 years. For every 100 females, there were 91 males. For every 100 females age 18 and over, there were 87.89 males.

According to the 2014 estimates from the American Community Survey, the median income for a household in the city was $31,566, and the median income for a family was $38,794. Males had a median income of $39,537 versus $33,983 for females. The per capita income for the city was $19,283. About 28.2% of families and 35.1% of the population were below the poverty line, including 50% of those under age 18 and 16.7% of those age 65 and over.

As of 2017, the United States Census Bureau indicated an estimated population of 146,396.

According to the 2010 United States Census, the population ages 16 and older commuted to work as follows:
 64.1% drive alone
 9.7% carpool
 11.4% walk
 8.6% use public buses (CENTRO)
 1.2% bike
 1.6% use a taxicab

Syracuse ranks 50th in the United States for transit ridership and 12th for most pedestrian commuters. Each day, 38,332 people commute into Onondaga County from the four adjoining counties (2006).

Work Area Profile Report

Worker Age

Earnings

Religion 

Christianity: Most Christians in Syracuse are Catholic, reflecting the influence of 19th and early 20th-century immigration patterns, when numerous Irish, German, Italian and eastern European Catholics settled in the city. The city has the Roman Catholic Cathedral of the Immaculate Conception. Syracuse is also home to the combined novitiate of the United States Northeast (UNE) and Maryland Provinces of the Society of Jesus (Jesuits). The historic Basilica of the Sacred Heart of Jesus is located near downtown (Roman Catholic, with Mass, offered in English and Polish). Tridentine Mass is offered multiple times a week at Transfiguration Parish in the Eastside neighborhood.

Another major historic church is the Episcopal St. Paul's Cathedral. Both cathedrals are located at Columbus Circle. They represent their respective dioceses, the Diocese of Syracuse (Roman Catholic) and the Diocese of Central New York (Episcopal).

The Assembly of God, the American Baptist Churches of the US, the Southern Baptist Convention, and the United Church of Christ are other Protestant denominations, and they have their state offices in the Greater Syracuse area. The dozens of churches in Syracuse include Seventh-Day Adventist, Eastern Orthodox, Jehovah's Witness, Christian Science, Reformed Presbyterian, and Metaphysical Christian.

Buddhism: Buddhism is represented by the Zen Center of Syracuse on the Seneca Turnpike; as well as a center on Park Street, on the city's Northside.

Hinduism: Hindu houses of worship include the Hindu Mandir of Central New York in Liverpool.

Islam: The Islamic Society of Central New York Mosque is located on Comstock Avenue and Muhammad's Study Group on West Kennedy Street.

Judaism: Several synagogues are located in the Syracuse metropolitan area, including Beth Shalom-Chevra Chas, Temple Adath Yeshurun, Shaarei Torah Orthodox Congregation of Syracuse, and Temple Concord, considered the ninth-oldest Jewish house of worship in the United States.

Sikhism: The gurdwara is at the Sikh Foundation of Syracuse, in Liverpool.

Unitarian Universalism: Two Unitarian Universalist societies in Syracuse: May Memorial Unitarian Society and First Unitarian Universalist Society of Syracuse.

Economy 

Formerly a manufacturing center, Syracuse's economy has faced challenges over the past decades as industrial jobs have left the area. The number of local and state government jobs also has been declining for several years. Syracuse's top employers now are primarily in higher education, research, health care and services; some high-tech manufacturing remains. University Hill is Syracuse's fastest-growing neighborhood, fueled by expansions by Syracuse University and Upstate Medical University (a division of the State University of New York), as well as dozens of small medical office complexes.

Steel and iron work

Top employers 
Top employers in the Syracuse region and the size of their workforce include the following:

 State University of New York Upstate Medical University: 10,959
 St. Joseph's Health (Syracuse, New York) (Trinity Health): 4,755
 Syracuse University: 4,402
 Lockheed Martin Corp.: 4,300
 Wegmans Food Markets: 3,713
 Crouse Hospital (Northwell Health): 3,100
 National Grid USA: 2,200
 Carrier Corporation: 1,552
 Loretto (elder care services): 1,465
 Syracuse VA Medical Center (Veterans Health): 1,400

Bristol-Myers Squibb, founded by alumni of nearby Hamilton College, has a complex in East Syracuse.

Syracuse's unemployment rate in August 2017 was 4.6 percent, comparable to the national rate of 4.5.

Tallest buildings 

Since 1927 the State Tower Building has been the tallest in Syracuse.

Neighborhoods 

The City of Syracuse officially recognizes 26 neighborhoods within its boundaries. Some of these have small additional neighborhoods and districts inside of them. In addition, Syracuse also owns and operates Syracuse Hancock International Airport on the territory of four towns north of the city.

Syracuse's neighborhoods reflect the historically ethnic and multicultural population. Traditionally, Irish, Polish and Ukrainian Americans settled on its west side (see Tipperary Hill); Jewish Americans on its east side; German and Italian Americans on the north side; and African-Americans on its south side. In recent years, large numbers of refugees from the Middle East have settled mainly on the north side as well.

Business districts 
In addition to the dominant Destiny USA shopping mall in Syracuse's Lakefront neighborhood, many of the city's more traditional neighborhoods continue to have active business districts:

 Downtown: Armory Square has replaced South Salina Street as the main retail and dining area of Downtown Syracuse. Armory Square has around 30 dining establishments, around 20 pubs, bars and clubs, and over 50 other retail stores. Similarly, but on a smaller scale, there is the Hanover Square area.
 Eastwood: Calling itself "the village within the city", this former village still has a retail corridor along James Street.
 Little Italy: A neighborhood with Italian origins, Little Italy (part of the Near Northeast neighborhood) has several blocks of bakeries, restaurants, pizzerias, shops, and services.
Sedgwick Farms: An affluent neighborhood on the northeast side of the city near Eastwood containing many architecturally-distinct, large, classic homes including a Sears Home designed by many noted architects. The neighborhood has historically been home to city leaders, state politicians, and leaders in Syracuse's industry and economy. 
Strathmore: A neighborhood on the southwest of the city that largely features well-maintained older, residential homes, including some designed by Ward Wellington Ward. There are several buildings listed on the National Register of Historic Places. The neighborhood is anchored by Hiawatha lake in Onondaga Park.
 University Hill: Marshall Street, along with its terminus South Crouse Avenue, is lined with stores, bars, and restaurants, primarily catering to the student population on "The Hill", as well as the over 25,000 people who work there daily. East Genesee Street at the northwestern corner of the neighborhood has several retail establishments, as well.
 Westcott: This neighborhood east of University Hill is inhabited by a wide variety of people, increasingly including some college students as the university grows but still primarily local families and residents. Single-family homes and two-unit apartments comprise the majority of housing. Westcott is known as a bohemian and liberal quarter, and each September hosts the Westcott Street Cultural Fair. The main business district is on Westcott Street between Beech and Dell streets and includes restaurants, bars, a consignment shop, and other businesses.

Education

Primary and secondary schools 
The Syracuse City School District consists of 34 schools and 4 alternative education programs. In the 2014–2015 school year, the K-12 enrollment was 20,084. 15% of students were classified as English Language Learners, 20% as students with disabilities, and 77% as economically disadvantaged. The drop-out rate was 6%. Syracuse City School District is collaborating with Say Yes to Education with the goal of every public school student graduating high school with the preparation and support to attain, afford, and complete a college or other postsecondary education. They are also one of the "Big 5," which consists of the five New York State School districts with populations over 125,000. "Big 5" school budgets are approved by annually by the Board of Education and city government as opposed to voters in an annual vote.

Colleges and universities 

One of Syracuse's major research universities is Syracuse University, located on University Hill. It had an enrollment of 22,484 for the 2017–2018 academic year.
Immediately adjacent to Syracuse University are two doctoral-degree granting universities, the SUNY Upstate Medical University and SUNY College of Environmental Science and Forestry. Both institutions have long-standing ties to Syracuse University. Upstate Medical University is also one of Syracuse's major research universities and is one of only about 125 academic medical centers in the country. The medical university directly generates 10,959 jobs, making it Central New York's largest employer. In addition, the Norton College of Medicine at SUNY Upstate is the only medical school in the Central New York region providing state of the art education to over 700+ students.

Also serving Syracuse are Le Moyne College on the city's eastern border, and Onondaga Community College, which has its main campus in the adjacent Town of Onondaga and has two smaller campuses, downtown and in Liverpool. A branch of SUNY's Empire State College is in downtown Syracuse, along with a campus of the nationwide Bryant & Stratton College. There are also the Pomeroy College of Nursing at Crouse Hospital and St. Joseph's College of Nursing.

Other colleges and universities in the area include Cornell University and Ithaca College in Ithaca, Hamilton College in Clinton, Oswego State College in Oswego, SUNY Cortland in Cortland, Morrisville State College in Morrisville, Colgate University in Hamilton, Cazenovia College in Cazenovia, Wells College in Aurora, and both Utica College and SUNY Institute of Technology in Utica.

Public libraries 
Onondaga County Public Library (OCPL) operates Syracuse's public libraries. Including the Central Library, ten city libraries, and 21 independent libraries in suburban Onondaga County. A library card from any OCPL library will work at any of the other OCPL libraries.

City libraries

 Central Library
 Beauchamp Branch Library
 Betts Branch Library
 Hazard Branch Library
 Mundy Branch Library
 Northeast Community Center Library
 Paine Branch Library
 Petit Branch Library
 Soule Branch Library
 Southwest Community Center Library
 White Branch Library

Suburban libraries

 Baldwinsville Public Library
 Brewerton NOPL
 Cicero NOPL
 DeWitt Community Library
 East Syracuse Free Library
 Elbridge Free Library
 Fairmount Community Library
 Fayetteville Free Library
 Jordan Bramley Library
 LaFayette Public Library
 Liverpool Public Library
 Manlius Library
 Marcellus Free Library
 Maxwell Memorial Library
 Minoa Library
 North Syracuse NOPL
 Onondaga Free Library
 Salina Library
 Skaneateles Library
 Solvay Public Library
 Tully Free Library

Arts and culture

Performing arts 
Live jazz music is the centerpiece of two annual outdoor festivals in Syracuse, the Syracuse Jazz Festival, Polish Festival as well as the CNY Jazz Arts Foundation's Jazz in the Square Festival. Performers in the last five years have included Chuck Mangione, Joshua Redman, Smokey Robinson, Branford Marsalis, The Bad Plus, Randy Brecker, Stanley Clarke, Jimmy Heath, Terrence Blanchard, Slide Hampton, Bobby Watson, Dr. John, and Aretha Franklin. The Polish Festival hosted Grammy winners Jimmy Sturr and his Orchestra, Polish music legend Stan Borys and Irena Jarocka, Grammy nominee Lenny Goumulka, LynnMarie, Dennis Polisky & The Maestro's Men, Jerry Darlak and the Buffalo Touch & The John Gora Band.

Syracuse was home to the 75-member Syracuse Symphony Orchestra (SSO), founded in 1961. The SSO's former music directors include Daniel Hege, Frederik Prausnitz and Kazuyoshi Akiyama. The orchestra performed over 200 concerts annually for an audience of over 250,000. The SSO filed for Chapter 7 Bankruptcy in 2011 and was replaced by the Syracuse Symphoria in 2013.

The Clinton String Quartet has been active for over 15 years and is based in the Syracuse area. All four members were also members of the Syracuse Symphony Orchestra.

The Syracuse Friends of Chamber Music for more than a half century have presented a series of concerts by various chamber ensembles.

The Society for New Music, founded in 1971, is the oldest new music organization in the state outside of New York City, and the only year-round new music group in upstate New York. The Society commissions at least one new work each year from a regional composer who awards the annual Brian Israel Prize to a promising composer under 30 years of age and produces the weekly "Fresh Ink" radio broadcast for WCNY-FM.

The Syracuse Opera Company is a professional company that generally performs three operas each season. Founded in 1963 as the Opera Chorus of the Syracuse Symphony Orchestra, it became independent in 1973. In addition to full performances, it offers several free outdoor concerts each year in Armory Square, Thornden Park, and elsewhere. The company has an annual budget of US$1  million and is the only professional opera company in upstate New York.

The Syracuse Shakespeare Festival is a charitable, educational, not-for-profit corporation dedicated to performing the works of William Shakespeare. It was founded in 2002 and is best known for its annual free Shakespeare-in-the-Park program at the Thornden Park Amphitheatre that has attracted more than 12,000 people since its inception.

Syracuse Stage presents experimental and creative theater; a number of its productions have been world premieres and have moved to Broadway. The venue was designed by its most famous former artistic director Arthur Storch. Its artistic director is Robert Hupp.

The Red House Arts Center, which opened in 2004, is a small theater housed in a converted hotel that offers performances by local, national, and international artists, and hosts regular exhibits in its art gallery, and screenings of independent films.

Syracuse is also known for a large contemporary music scene, particularly in the heavy metal, hardcore, ska, and punk rock genres. From 1997 to 2003, Syracuse (or its suburbs) was home to Hellfest, a major hardcore music festival.

Museums and art galleries 

 Everson Museum of Art, which opened in 1968 in a building designed by I.M. Pei, features one of the most extensive pottery collections in the United States along with works of American art, dating from the 18th century to the present. This collection includes paintings, sculptures, drawings, photography, and video.
 Erie Canal Museum is a museum dedicated to preserving the history of the Erie Canal and its role in Syracuse's growth.
 International Mask and Puppet Museum is a museum in Little Italy focusing on masks and puppets, the latter of which are also used in educational performances for children.
 Milton J. Rubenstein Museum of Science and Technology is a museum in the Armory Square neighborhood that features exhibits in science and technology.
 Onondaga Historical Association Museum & Research Center, at 321 Montgomery Street downtown, features exhibits on the past of the Syracuse region and contains historical archives relating to the area's history. Its exhibits include a presentation of the history of the Underground Railroad.
Syracuse and Onondaga County Fire Museum, will occupy the space of the former Syracuse Fire Department fire station 4 on Wolf Street, built in the 1800s (plans announced October 2020).

Parks and recreation 
Burnet Park includes the first public golf course in the United States (1901) and Rosamond Gifford Zoo. Other major parks include Thornden Park, Schiller Park, Sunnycrest Park, Onondaga Park and Kirk Park. There are 12 public pools, two public ice rinks (Sunnycrest and Meachem), and two public nine-hole golf courses (Burnet and Sunycrest Parks) in the city. Onondaga Park, located in the historic Strathmore neighborhood, features Hiawatha Lake, and a beautiful gazebo, often used for prom photos and wedding shoots.

Right outside the city proper, along the east side and north end of Onondaga Lake, is Onondaga Lake Park. The adjacent Onondaga Lake Parkway is closed to vehicular traffic several hours on Sundays during the summer months, so it can be used for walking, running, biking, and rollerblading. During the holiday season, the park hosts Lights on the Lake, a  drive-through light show.

Infrastructure

Transportation

Public transit 
Syracuse is served by the Central New York Regional Transportation Authority, or Centro. Centro operates bus service in Syracuse and its suburbs, as well as to outlying metropolitan area cities such as Auburn, Fulton, and Oswego.

Proposed public transit projects

In 2005, local millionaire Tom McDonald proposed an aerial tramway system, called Salt City Aerial Transit (S.C.A.T.), to link the university to the transportation center. The first segment from Syracuse University to downtown was estimated to cost $5  million, which McDonald planned to raise himself. Due to perceived low operating costs, the system was envisioned as running continuously.

Rail 
Syracuse (station stop code SYR) is served by Amtrak's Empire Service, Lake Shore Limited, and Maple Leaf lines. Amtrak's station is part of the William F. Walsh Regional Transportation Center.

The Empire Service runs twice daily in each direction between Niagara Falls, NY and New York Penn Station, with major stops in Buffalo, Rochester, Syracuse, Utica, and Albany along the way. The Maple Leaf runs once daily in each direction, and follows the same route as the Empire Service, however instead of terminating in Niagara Falls, it continues on to Toronto.

Empire Service and Maple Leaf trains stop at the seasonal New York State Fair – NYF station during the New York State Fair's annual run each August. The NYF Station is located along the southern part of the fairgrounds, near the historic train car display of the Central New York Chapter, of the National Railway Historical Society.

The Lake Shore Limited runs once daily in each direction between Chicago and Boston or New York City (via two sections splitting Albany-Rensselaer). It follows the same route as the Empire Service and Maple Leaf between New York City and Buffalo-Depew, where it diverges and continues on through Cleveland and Toledo to Chicago.

A regional commuter rail service, OnTrack, was active from 1994 until it was discontinued in 2007 due to low ridership. Its sole route connected the Carousel Center to southern Syracuse, often extending to Jamesville in the summer.

Bus 
Greyhound Lines, Megabus, OurBus and Trailways provide long-distance bus service to destinations including New York City, Boston, Buffalo, Albany, and Toronto. Greyhound, Megabus, and Trailways use the William F. Walsh Regional Transportation Center in the northern area of the city, while OurBus stops near the campus of Syracuse University.

Air service 
Syracuse is served by the Syracuse Hancock International Airport in nearby Salina, near Mattydale. The airport is named after Clarence E. Hancock, a former US Congressman representing Syracuse. The airport is served by 8 major airlines, which provide non-stop flights to important airline hubs and business centers such as Atlanta, Boston, Charlotte, Chicago, Detroit, Denver, Ft. Lauderdale, New York City, Orlando, Philadelphia, Tampa, Washington, DC, as well as connecting service to 147 foreign cities in 87 countries. Cargo carriers FedEx and UPS also serve the airport. New York City can be reached in under an hour flight. The City of Syracuse owns the airport and property, while a public for-benefit corporation runs the airport, the Syracuse Regional Airport Authority.  The airport is protected by the Syracuse Fire Department's Station 4, and patrolled by Syracuse Police Department officers.

Major highways and roads 
Four Interstate Highways run through the Syracuse area:

  Interstate 81 runs north–south through Syracuse, and provides access to Canada, Pennsylvania and points south. Its downtown portion is extremely narrow, only consisting of four lanes and few onramps. The highway was known as the Penn-Can Expressway when first built, leading to the Penn-Can Mall and other similarly named developments. It will soon be rerouted to follow I-481's route around the city instead of going through downtown. The current route will be redesignated as Interstate 81 Business. 
  Interstate 90, signed as the New York State Thruway within New York State, runs east–west, just north of the city. It is a toll highway that provides access to Rochester, Buffalo, Albany, and the north–south (Interstate 87) part of the Thruway leads to New York City.
  Interstate 690 runs east–west through the city, and provides access to Interstate 90, as well as to Syracuse's northwestern and eastern suburbs. A spur off I-690 directly west of the city, NY 695, provides freeway access to the southwestern suburbs. It meets Interstate 81 in downtown Syracuse in a highly complex and incomplete intersection. Most of its routing through the city directly replaced the former elevated rail lines of the New York Central four-track mainline, a fact quite notable by the city's former main rail terminal, where the freeway spans the width between the terminal and its outermost platform. In 1981 artist Duke Epolito erected sculptures of "passengers" on the single remaining passenger platform. The piece is entitled "Waiting for the Night Train."
  Interstate 481 forms an eastern loop around the city and continues to the northwest as NY 481 to Fulton and Oswego, on the shore of Lake Ontario. The highway was built to provide rapid access to eastern suburbs after the affluent community members in Manllius and Fayetteville squashed the original design to extend Interstate 690 to serve the eastern suburbs. The highway is soon to be replaced in designation by Interstate 81.

Two US Highways run through the Syracuse area:

  U.S. Highway 11 (Route 223 in Quebec to New Orleans) runs north–south through Syracuse, including downtown, and it follows Salina, State, and Wolf Streets.
  U.S. Highway 20 (Boston to Newport, Oregon) passes south of Syracuse.

New York State Route Expressways:

  New York State Route 481 travels from NY 104 in Oswego to the terminus of Interstate 481 north of Syracuse.
  New York State Route 690 was built as an extension of Interstate 690 to serve the northwest suburbs of Syracuse. The route is a four-lane divided highway from its southern end at I-690, where it meets Interstate 90 (NYS Thruway), to its end northwest of Baldwinsville in Lysander at NY 48 and NY 631.
  New York State Route 695 is a short state highway west of Syracuse in the village of Solvay in Onondaga County. The number of the highway was derived from the two highways that NY 695 links, Interstate 690 and NY 5.

New York State Routes
  New York State Route 5 runs east–west through Syracuse, including downtown, and follows Erie Boulevard and West Genesee Street.
  New York State Route 80's western terminus is at NY 175 on the south side. The route follows Valley Drive.
  New York State Route 92's western terminus is in downtown Syracuse at US 11. The route follows East Genesee Street.
  New York State Route 173 runs east–west through Syracuse and follows the Seneca Turnpike through the South Valley neighborhood.
  New York State Route 175 follows South Avenue and West Kennedy Street to its eastern terminus at US 11.
  New York State Route 290's western terminus is at US 11 just north of I-81. The route follows James Street.
  New York State Route 298's western terminus is at exit 9 on I-690. The route follows Bear and Court Streets, Genant Drive and Sunset Avenue.
  New York State Route 370's eastern terminus is at US 11 in the Lakefront neighborhood. The route follows Park Street.
  New York State Route 598 is a short north–south highway following Midler Avenue to its southern terminus at NY 5.

Public works 
Public services such as garbage pickup, street plowing, sewage, and street and traffic maintenance are provided by the Department of Public Works (DPW).

Utilities 
The Syracuse water system was one of the few water systems built and operated before federal funding. The water system was constructed mainly to support the industries around Syracuse, New York. Construction of Syracuse's water system began in 1868. The water is brought in on a gravity fed system from Skaneateles Lake, through an unfiltered system, and carried into the city. It is noted for having some of the best drinking water in the nation, due to the quality of the lake.

In 2015, the city experienced an average of at least one water main break per day. Between 2005 and 2015, the city suffered 2,000 water main breaks. Mayor Stephanie Miner estimated of the cost to fix the city's water infrastructure at $1 billion over a 10–15-year period. On February 25, 2015, Miner testified before a joint hearing of the state Assembly Ways and Means Committee and state Senate Finance Committee. Miner testified that the 2014 polar vortex contributed to the increase in Syracuse's water main break.

On March 3, the 100th water main break in Syracuse in 2015 occurred on James Street. Early in 2015, Miner lobbied the state for funding to fix the city's aging water system. New York Governor Andrew Cuomo declined to help, stating that the city should improve its economy and increase tax revenues, which would enable the city to fund their own water pipe repairs.

Government

Executive 

The city is headed by an elected mayor who is limited to two four-year terms. Syracuse has a Strong mayor-council form of government. On November 7, 2017, Ben Walsh was elected mayor. He began in January 2018 as the first independent mayor of Syracuse in over 100 years. The last independent mayor of Syracuse was Louis Will, who was elected in 1913. The previous mayor was former Common Councilor at Large Stephanie Miner, who was elected on November 3, 2009; she was the first female mayor of Syracuse. Miner was preceded by former Syracuse Common Council President Matthew Driscoll, who first assumed the position in 2001 after the former mayor, Roy Bernardi, resigned upon his appointment by President George W. Bush to a position in the Department of Housing and Urban Development. After serving the remaining term, Driscoll was re-elected that year, and again in 2005.

Legislative 
The legislative branch of Syracuse is the Syracuse Common Council. It consists of a president and nine members:

Judicial 
The Onondaga County Supreme and County Court is the trial court of general jurisdiction for Syracuse. It is also the administrative court for the Fifth District of the New York State Unified Court System. Judges for these courts are elected at-large.

The U.S. District Court for the Northern District of New York also holds court in downtown Syracuse at the James Hanley Federal Building.

Police department 
The Syracuse Police Department (SPD) is the principal law enforcement agency of the city of Syracuse, New York. For 2017–18, the police department budget was $48.5 million. Effective April 22, 2022, longtime Deputy Chief Joe Cecile is Chief of the SPD, following his predecessor Kenton Buckner's retirement. Police headquarters is in the John C. Dillon Public Safety Building at 511 South State Street. The SPD is divided into three patrol zones North (Lakefront, Northside, Eastwood, Tip Hill), South West (Strathmore, Valley, Southside, Near-Westside), and Southeast (University Area, Downtown, Meadowbrook, Eastside).

In 2019, a jury awarded Elijah Johnson $35,000 after he was beaten with unreasonable force by three police officers while being arrested. In addition, the city was forced to pay attorneys fees, at a total cost to taxpayers of $213,000.

Surveillance 
Established in 2011, SPD operates a network of 521 surveillance cameras called the Criminal Observation and Protection System (COPS). Between 2011 and 2014 more than 40 utility pole mounted cameras were installed, mainly in the Southwest and Northeast neighborhoods. The cameras were funded by federal, state, and private grants. In Summer 2014, 10 cameras were approved for installation in Downtown Syracuse, the first area not targeted because of high levels of violent crime. Live monitoring of Clinton Square for suspicious people during events and festivals was planned, although police agreed to a prohibition on the use of cameras to monitor protests. Twenty-five additional cameras were planned to be installed in 2016.

In spring 2017, the surveillance system was augmented with the installation of ShotSpotter gunshot detection sensors. Syracuse Mayor Stephanie Miner cited increasing public acceptance of police cameras and lower technology costs as factors in the decision.

Fire department 

The Syracuse Fire Department (SFD) protects the City of Syracuse from fires and other dangers. The department provides multiple services in addition to fire related calls: multi-county regional HAZ-MAT response, first response to medical and trauma calls, unmanned aerial vehicle (drone) capabilities, and teams experienced in high-angle rope, swift water, and confined space rescues. The Chief of Fire is Michael J. Monds. SFD headquarters is in the John C. Dillon Public Safety Building at 511 South State Street. The department has a Class 1 rating from the Insurance Services Office, it's the best rating obtainable, which has a direct effect on the fire insurance of any property within the city. The SFD operates out of 11 fire stations, organized into three districts (akin to battalions), located throughout the city. The SFD currently maintains nine engine companies (operating nine corresponding mini units), five truck companies, one heavy rescue company, a manpower-squad company, and several special and support units. The department also provides primary response coverage and ARFF coverage to the Syracuse Clarance E. Hancock International Airport (station 4).

Fire Station Locations 

* Former

Media 
syracuse.com is the most popular local media site in Central New York, according to ComScore, with an average of 3.98 Million unique users. Advance Media NY is the home of syracuse.com, who also produces the local newspaper, The Post-Standard. The two media units combined reach 422,000 in the Syracuse DMA, according to Nielsen, 2022.  Advance Media NY is a digital media and marketing agency, who helps businesses tell their stories in print, digital and visuals. It has a full service internal ad agency.
syracuse.com features the latest in local, sports news, breaking news and entertainment, with daily CNY weather updates.

Radio

Newspapers 
Syracuse has one major daily morning newspaper, The Post-Standard. Until 2001, Syracuse also had an evening paper, The Herald-Journal. It focuses on local news throughout Central New York, and has a reporter in the Washington, DC.

Before the merger with the evening paper, the Post-Standard was named among the "10 best newspapers in America with a circulation of under 100,000" by Al Neuharth of USA Today (run by a competing organization). Since the merger, circulation has increased to over 120,000. Even outside of its four-county delivery area, the paper is available in many convenience stores and supermarkets from the Canada–US border to the New York–Pennsylvania border. The newspaper partly caters to this audience as well, covering many stories from the Ithaca, Utica, and Watertown areas. Since opening a new printing press in 2002, the paper calls itself "America's Most Colorful Newspaper," as almost every page contains color.

The Daily Orange, the newspaper of Syracuse University and SUNY ESF students, is read by over 20,000 people daily, and is widely distributed in the University Hill neighborhood and Armory Square. The Dolphin, the weekly student newspaper of Le Moyne College is also available, read mainly by Le Moyne students.

There are other popular free newspapers, including Eagle Newspaper'''s downtown edition, the City Eagle, and Table Hopping'', which focuses on the restaurant and entertainment scene. Additionally, there's a weekly newspaper, CNY Vision, that publishes news and information focusing on the local African American community.

There is also a Hispanic-based monthly publication, called the CNY Latino newspaper, published by the CNY Latino Media Consortium (www.cnylatino.com) in BOTH paper format and online at www.cnylatinonewspaper.com, covering not only the city of Syracuse, also all the cities and towns between Rochester & Albany AND Watertown & Binghamton.

Magazines 
The Syracuse area is covered in a regional lifestyle publication called "The Good Life, Central New York Magazine," mostly known as "Central New York Magazine" (www.readcnymagazine.com). The magazine is bi-monthly (six issues per year) and offers print + digital and digital only subscriptions; it is also sold at local independent retailers, Wegmans, Tops Friendly Markets, and Barnes & Noble. The magazine covers the greater Syracuse and Central New York area, including Onondaga, Oswego, Madison, Oneida Cortland, Tompkins and Cayuga counties. 

Central New York Magazine premiered in May 2006 and tells "positive and uniquely CNY stories." Coverage areas include local shops and small businesses, regional travel destinations, food and drink, home decor, attractions and things to do, artisans, changemakers and area trends.

Television 

According to Nielsen Media Research, Syracuse is the fifth largest television market in New York State and the 87th largest in the United States (as of the 2020–2021 TV season). Six major full-power stations serve the city: WSTM-TV 3 (NBC), WTVH 5 (CBS), WSYR-TV 9 (ABC), WCNY-TV 24/cable 11 (PBS), WSPX-TV 56/cable 4 (Ion), and WSYT 68/cable 8 (Fox). WSTM-TV also operates the area's CW affiliate on its DT2 subchannel and cable channel 6, and WSYT carries the MyNetworkTV affiliation on channel 43 and cable channel 7; both stations were previously separately-licensed stations before having their licenses returned to the FCC.

Additionally, networks such as Cornerstone Television channel 11 & 22, Univision, and MTV2 are broadcast by low-power television stations.

Syracuse University's student-run TV station is CitrusTV. CitrusTV programming is broadcast on the university campus on the Orange Television Network.

Syracuse's cable television provider is Charter Spectrum (Charter Communications acquired Time Warner Cable in 2016), which, as a part of its regular and digital offerings, provides a 24-hour local news channel (Spectrum News Central New York), public access channel, and an additional PBS channel. Several suburbs also have access to Verizon Fios for cable television. Dish Network and DirecTV also provide local satellite television subscribers with local broadcast stations.

Sports

Current teams

Collegiate teams

Syracuse University sports are by far the most attended sporting events in the Syracuse area. Basketball games often draw over 30,000 fans, and football games over 40,000. The university has bred dozens of famous professional players since starting an athletics program in the late nineteenth century, including all-time greats Ernie Davis, Jim Brown, Larry Csonka and Dave Bing. Both teams play in the JMA Wireless Dome.

In addition to many former professional minor league teams, Syracuse was previously the home of several top-level pro teams, most notably the Syracuse Nationals who played a total of 17 seasons between the NBL and NBA, and won the 1955 NBA Finals before moving to Philadelphia and becoming the Philadelphia 76ers. Syracuse was also the home of two different Major League Baseball teams: the Syracuse Stars of the National League in 1879, which didn't finish their first season; and the Syracuse Stars of the American Association in 1890.

Notable people

In fiction

Events

Sister cities 
Syracuse's sister cities are:

  Chiayi City, Taiwan
  Fuzhou, Fujian, China
  Taiz, Yemen
  Tampere, Finland

See also 

List of Syracuse University people

References

External links 

 
 Syracuse Central
 
 Syracuse.com – News website affiliated with The Post-Standard
 Syracuse.com's guide for Syracuse visitors and entertainment
 Syracuse Arts
 Buildings of Syracuse
 Syracuse Wiki – Community Edited Area Resource
 Visit Syracuse

 
1825 establishments in New York (state)
Academic enclaves
Cities in Onondaga County, New York
Cities in New York (state)
County seats in New York (state)
Erie Canal
Catholic missions of New France
New York State Heritage Areas
Populated places established in 1825
Populated places on the Underground Railroad
Ukrainian communities in the United States